North Hanley is a St. Louis MetroLink station. Opened in 1993 near the North Hanley overpass of Interstate 70, it is primarily a commuter station with 1,731 park-and-ride spaces, including 657 in a garage, and a major bus transfer center for Metro in North St. Louis County.

The station includes A Line Meant (Circular) Alignment (Reasoning), a 2004 sculpture by Bob Hansman and Ben Hoffmann. It is made of 20 four-inch square, stainless-steel tubes of various lengths that connect the parking garage's stairwell to nearby landscaping. The work was commissioned by Metro's Arts in Transit program.

In 2022, the concrete area between the bus bays and MetroLink entrance was given vibrantly colored elements in a “Transit: We All Ride Together” theme, including shade structures, seating, musical elements, ground murals, and window designs. The fourth "Transit Stop Transformation" project to be completed, it was unveiled on October 12, 2022, by Citizens for Modern Transit, AARP in St. Louis, and Metro Transit with St. Louis REALTORS, Employment Connection and Bywater Development Group.

Station layout
The platform is reached via ramps and walkways on each end that connect to the bus-boarding plaza.

References

External links
 St. Louis Metro

MetroLink stations in St. Louis County, Missouri
Red Line (St. Louis MetroLink)
Railway stations in the United States opened in 1993